Kirovsky District (Kirovy rajon) is an administrative and municipal district (raion), one of the eight in the Republic of North Ossetia–Alania, Russia. It is located in the north of the republic. Its administrative center is the rural locality (a selo) of Elkhotovo. Population:  26,571 (2002 Census);  The population of Elkhotovo accounts for 45.4% of the district's total population.

Notable residents 

Chermen Kobesov (born 1996 in Elkhotovo), para-athlete 
Artur Pagayev (born 1971 in Kardzhin), football player and coach

References

Notes

Sources

Districts of North Ossetia–Alania